Special service may refer to:

Awards
 Special Service Medal (disambiguation), an award by several countries

Organizations
 Special forces, a group of highly skilled soldiers performing duties that conventional units can not perform
 Special Service Brigade, a unit of the British Army
 Special Service Group, a unit of the Pakistan Army
 Special Service Group (Navy), a unit of the Pakistan Navy
 Special Service Wing, a unit of the Pakistan Air Force
 Special Service Squadron, a former unit of the United States Navy
 Special Service Squadron, a former unit of the Royal Navy (UK) which undertook the 1923 Cruise of the Special Service Squadron
 Special Services (entertainment), a former division of the United States Army that provided entertainment for troops

Others
 Special service, a radiocommunication service in accordance with ITU Radio Regulations article 1.60
 For Special Services, a 1982 James Bond novel
 "Special Service", a 1989 The Twilight Zone episode